D+M Group, formerly known as DMGlobal and D&M Holdings, was a Japanese corporation that owned several audio and video brands. It was formed in 2002 from the merger of Denon and Marantz. It had acquired several other companies since that time. Prior to 2008, it was owned by RHJ International, which is associated with Ripplewood Holdings. In 2008, it was acquired by K. K. BCJ-2, a Tokyo corporation owned by investment funds advised by Bain Capital. In August, 2010, Jim Caudill, a former Stanley Black & Decker executive, was named CEO.

In April 2014, D+M Group sold Denon Professional, Marantz Professional, and Denon DJ to inMusic. In February 2017, D+M Group was acquired by American company Sound United LLC.

Holdings and brands
 Boston Acoustics
 D&M Professional
 Denon
 Denon DJ
 Marantz
 Polk Audio
 Rio (defunct)
 The Speaker Company

References

External links
 Official website

Electronics companies of Japan
Holding companies of Japan
Electronics companies established in 2002
Holding companies established in 2002
Manufacturing companies established in 2002
Japanese companies established in 2002
Bain Capital companies
2017 mergers and acquisitions